The World Junior Alpine Skiing Championships 2020 were the 39th World Junior Alpine Skiing Championships, held between 7 and 11 March 2020 in Narvik, Norway.

Schedule
All times are local (UTC+1).

Medal summary

Men's events

Ladies events

Team event

Medal table

References

External links
Official website
World Junior Alpine Skiing Championships 2020 results at fis-ski.com

World Junior Alpine Skiing Championships
2020 in alpine skiing
Alpine skiing competitions in Norway
2020 in Norwegian sport
Alpine skiing
March 2020 sports events in Europe
Sports events curtailed due to the COVID-19 pandemic
sport in Nordland
Narvik